Lance Rhodes is an American baseball coach and former pitcher. He is the head baseball coach at Southern Illinois University Carbondale. Rhodes played Saint Louis University in 2005 through 2006 and at Southeast Missouri State University from 2007 to 2008.

In 2019, Rhodes was named the head coach of the Southern Illinois Salukis baseball program.

See also
 List of current NCAA Division I baseball coaches

References

External links
Southern Illinois Salukis profile

Living people
Saint Louis Billikens baseball players
Southeast Missouri State Redhawks baseball players
Wabash Valley Warriors baseball coaches
Southeast Missouri State Redhawks baseball coaches
Missouri Tigers baseball coaches
Southern Illinois Salukis baseball coaches
People from Sikeston, Missouri
Baseball coaches from Missouri
1985 births
Emporia State University alumni